Rhodoferax antarcticus is a psychrophilic, phototrophic, nonsulfur, highly motile bacterium from the genus Rhodoferax, which was isolated from an Antarctic  microbial mat in Ross Island.

References

External links
Type strain of Rhodoferax antarcticus at BacDive -  the Bacterial Diversity Metadatabase

Comamonadaceae
Bacteria described in 2001